Myrciaria evanida is a species of plant in the family Myrtaceae. It is endemic to Espírito Santo and Minas Gerais in Brazil. First described in 2013, it resembles Myrciaria floribunda.

References

evanida
Crops originating from the Americas
Crops originating from Brazil
Tropical fruit
Flora of South America
Endemic flora of Brazil
Fruits originating in South America
Cauliflory
Fruit trees
Berries
Plants described in 2013